Moos is a town on the Bodensee (Lake Constance) in the district of Konstanz in Baden-Württemberg in Germany.

References

Konstanz (district)